Constanzo Benedetto Bonvicino, (Latinized as Constantius Benedictus Bonvicinus, and also known as Bonvoisin) (1739 – 25 January 1812) was an Italian chemist. 

Bonvicino was born in Centallo in a wealthy family and was educated in medicine and chemistry at the University of Turin (1765) after which he became a professor of natural history and pharmaceutical chemistry in 1800. He took an interest in mineralogy, studying opals, and in a range of chemical studies including analyses of water, fungal toxins, methods to detect iron. He was also among the early Italian chemists to criticize the phlogiston theory.

References 

1739 births
1812 deaths
Italian chemists
Scientists from Turin